Time and Love may refer to:

 Time & Love, a 1972 jazz album
 Time and Love: The Essential Masters, a 2000 compilation album
 Time and Love: The Music of Laura Nyro, a 1997 compilation album

See also
 "Time Is Love", a 2012 song by Josh Turner
 Time of Love,  a 1990 Iranian film
 Time to Love (disambiguation)